Chiranakhon Stadium is a football stadium in Hat Yai, Songkhla Thailand.  It is the home stadium of Hatyai F.C. and Songkhla FC.  The stadium holds 25,000 spectators and opened in 1944.

References

External links
Stadium information

Football venues in Thailand
Buildings and structures in Songkhla province
Sports venues completed in 1944
Sport in Songkhla province
1944 establishments in Thailand